Stick With Me, Kid is a British television series created by Peter Hume that aired in 1995 on The Disney Channel. The series was created by Peter Hume, produced by Buena Vista Productions Ltd. and starred Kristopher Milnes and Leigh Lawson. The executive producer was Daniel Petrie Jr., Supervising Producers were Lee Goldberg & William Rabkin and Hume, and the producers were Ken Kaufman and Harry Waterson.

Premise
The show revolved around the life of Ripley Hillard (Milnes), a prodigious but troubled 13-year-old boy. After a diamond is stolen from the local museum, Ripley is determined to solve the case, but fails to attract any attention from the police, as he is only 13 years old. He then seeks the help of Grant Logan (Lawson), an out of work actor, to pose as a detective for him, as the police will only listen to the ideas of an adult.

The first two episodes (the TV movie pilot edited into individual episodes) revolve around the diamond theft, but the remaining 11 episodes focused on a different case each week. Grant would put on the act of the detective, but Ripley would always be the brains. Grant also helped Ripley with his personal problems such as being bullied at school and lack of a father.

List of the episodes

External links

1995 British television series debuts
1995 British television series endings
Disney Channel original programming
English-language television shows